Things as They Are is a 2012 Chilean film directed and written by Fernando Lavanderos and filmed in Santiago, Chile. It premiered in Chile at the 2012 Festival Internacional de Viña del Mar (International Festival of Viña del Mar) and internationally at the Festival Internacional de Cine de Mar del Plata (International Film Festival Mar del Plata) in Argentina.

Plot
Jerónimo is an antisocial local man who rents rooms in his home to expats so he can snoop around their belongings. One day Sanna arrives a girl who will change Jerónimo's life. They start getting closer until Jerónimo discovers that Sanna is hiding something in his house.

Cast
 Cristóbal Palma
 Ragni Orsal Skogsrod
 Isaac Arriagada
 José Miguel Barros

Critics
The film has been well received by critics. Marcelo Morales of CineChile said: "Things As They Are is not just a good film it is also the confirmation of a director who has (in very few films, all made freehand with limited resources) established a complete personal voice."

Awards
 Special Jury Prize, Critics Award, International Film Festival of Viña del Mar, 2012.
 Best Film, International Film Festival of Mar del Plata, 2012.
 Chilean Long Competition: Best Ensemble, Festival Cine / / B, 2012.
 Independent Camera Award, Karlovy Vary International Film Festival, Czech Republic, 2013.
 Best Director, Havana Film Festival New York, 2013.

See also

 Cinema of Chile

References

External links

 Las cosas como son (2012)

2012 films
2012 comedy-drama films
Films shot in Chile
2010s Spanish-language films
Chilean comedy-drama films
2012 comedy films